The Cávado River is a river located in northern Portugal.

It runs  from Fonte da Pipa, near the triangulation station Larouco, to its mouth into the Atlantic Ocean next to the city of Esposende. It flows through the districts of Vila Real and Braga, in the Cávado Region, and flows near the towns of Vila Verde and Esposende and cities of Braga and Barcelos.

Its tributaries are the Homem River, Rabagão River and Saltadouro River.

Dams and Reservoirs 
Beginning at the headwaters, there are 5 dams on the Cávado:

Gallery

Cávado River